Fittkau or Fitkau is a surname. Notable people with the surname include:

 Agnieszka Perepeczko born Agnieszka Fitkau, Polish actress
 Ernst Josef Fittkau (1927-2012), German entomologist
 Heide Fittkau-Garthe, German psychologist
 Ludger Fittkau

German-language surnames